The Taipei Municipal Song Shan Senior High School (SSSH) is a Taiwanese high school, located in the Xinyi District, Taipei.

Outline

1958：Founded and named as Taipei Municipal Song Shan Junior Middle School.
1968：reorganized into Taipei Municipal Song Shan Junior High School.
1987：Taipei City Government formed Pre-opening Office of Song Shan Senior High in accordance with the policy by Government of the Republic of China (Taiwan).
1989：reorganized into Taipei Municipal Song Shan Senior High School.

Position
Song Shan Senior High School is located in Xinyi District, new commercial center of Taipei City. Keelung Road and Songlong Road cross with each other in front of the main entrance; the school is close to exits of Civic Blvd Expressway and Huandong Ave. Taipei City Hall Station( Blue Line, Taipei Rapid Transit System) is walking about 5 minutes away.
United Daily News Group, Taipei City Hall, National Police Agency, Taipei Dome, Taipei 101 , Taipei City Hall, Uni Style Department Store, Shin Kong Mitsukoshi Department Store, Taipei Nan Shan Plaza, Far Eastern Department Store, Eslite Bookstore and Sun Yat-sen Memorial Hall are the landmark buildings situated nearby.[

Campus
The campus contains a five-story academic building, an administration building, a library building, an arts and music building, a gymnasium, an indoor pool,  runway playground, four volleyball courts, a tennis court, and 12 outdoor basketball hoops. All courts can be lightened at night.

Successive principal

See also
List of schools in Taiwan
High school
Education in Taiwan

References

External links

 Taipei Song-Yun Choir
 Song-Shan Senior High in DeepBlue
 Song-Shan Basketball Team's Blog

1958 establishments in Taiwan
High schools in Taiwan
Schools in Taipei
Educational institutions established in 1958